Ewon Benedick (born 1 August 1983) is a Malaysian politician who has served as Minister of Entrepreneur Development and Cooperative in the Pakatan Harapan (PH) administration under Prime Minister Anwar Ibrahim since December 2022, the Member of Parliament (MP) for Penampang since November 2022 and Member of the Sabah State Legislative Assembly (MLA) for Kadamaian since May 2018. He served as State Minister of Rural Development of Sabah in the Sabah Heritage Party (WARISAN) administration under former Chief Minister Shafie Apdal from May 2018 to the collapse of the WARISAN state administration in September 2020. He is a member of the United Progressive Kinabalu Organisation (UPKO), a component party of the PH coalition. He has served as the 3rd President of UPKO since January 2023. He was also Vice President of UPKO before his promotion to the party presidency in January 2023. He is one of the two UPKO MPs and sole UPKO MLA. He was set to officially take over Wilfred Madius Tangau as the 3rd UPKO president after the UPKO party election in the party triennial delegates convention on 16 October 2022. However on 10 October 2022, the 14th Parliament was dissolved and the 2022 general election was to be held on 19 November 2022, the convention was delayed to 15 January 2023.

Election results

Honours 
  :
  Commander of the Order of Kinabalu (PGDK) - Datuk (2018)

References

Members of the Sabah State Legislative Assembly
Kadazan-Dusun people
United Progressive Kinabalu Organisation politicians
Living people
1983 births